The 2002–03 Sevens World Series was the fourth edition of the global circuit for men's national rugby sevens teams, organised by the International Rugby Board. The season ran from December 2002 to June 2003 and was played out over a series of only seven tournaments. A further three tournaments had originally been scheduled but were cancelled due to concerns about the SARS virus. New Zealand won its fourth consecutive series, with England finishing as runner-up.

Itinerary
Dubai
George
Brisbane
New Zealand
Hong Kong
Cardiff
London

Due to concerns stemming from the spread of respiratory virus SARS, tournaments scheduled for China, Malaysia, and Singapore were cancelled. Further concerns also resulted in two nations — Italy and France — foregoing the opportunity to compete at the Hong Kong Sevens.

Final standings
The points awarded to teams at each event, as well as the overall season totals, are shown in the table below. Points for the event winners are indicated in bold. A zero (0) is recorded in the event column where a team played in a tournament but did not gain any points. A dash (–) is recorded in the event column if a team did not compete at a tournament.

Source: rugby7.com (archived)

Notes:
 Light blue line on the left indicates a core team eligible to participate in all events of the series.

References

External links

 
World Rugby Sevens Series